The Southern Appalachian Labor School, or SALS (pronounced like the possessive form of Sal) as it is abbreviated, is a non-profit organization that serves Fayette County, West Virginia.  It was founded in 1977, initially to educate local workers and others about labor law, unions and organization.  Over the years, SALS has grown to include programs for low income housing, weatherization and rehabilitation of homes, three programs for children, two separate food assistance programs, and Youthbuild/Americorps/Americorps VISTA programs through the Corporation for National Service.

SALS hosts a number of volunteers each year, through organizations such as Christian Endeavor, Group Workcamps, and Global Volunteers. SALS hosted over 1500 volunteers in 2007.

SALS has several offices: at WVU Tech in Montgomery, in Kincaid, and at the SALS Community Center in Beards Fork.

SALS releases several newsletters each year that highlight the organization's current projects and issues.

External links
 Southern Appalachian Labor School - official site

Labor schools
Fayette County, West Virginia
Organizations based in West Virginia